The Horror of Beauty is a full-length album by the metal band My Ruin. It was released in 2003.

Critical reception
Chronicles of Chaos wrote that "no amount of musical invention would be able to drown out [Tairrie] B's relentlessly self-obsessed and tiresome whining." CMJ New Music Report called the album "the most dirt-encrusted rock Miss B has ever attempted," writing that My Ruin "walks the razor's edge between subversive femininity and pro-womanhood."

Track listing 
 "Stage Fright" - 1:18
 "Made to Measure" - 4:41
 "American Psycho" - 4:02
 "Spitfire" - 2:37
 "Burn the Witch" - 3:25
 "Radio Silence" - 3:31
 "Hot in the House of God" - 3:40
 "Nazimova" - 3:18
 "Stinkface" - 2:52
 "Weightless" - 2:36
 "Bravenet" - 6:27
 "Ten Minutes to Hollywood" - 3:45
 "Get Pretty" - 3:28
 "Rid of Me" (PJ Harvey cover) – 4:15

Extra content 
Also included on the CD are two videos that can be viewed by playing the disc through a computer: the promotional video for "Made To Measure" and a behind-the-scenes film of the making of the video.

Personnel 
 Tairrie B – vocals/lyrics
 Mick Murphy – guitars, producer on tracks 1, 2, 3, 4, 7, 10, 11, 12, 13 and 14
 Meghan Mattox – bass guitar
 Yael – drums
 Nick Raskulinecz – producer, engineer and mixer on tracks 5, 6, 8 and 9
 Roy Mayorga – recorded vocals on track 5
 Todd Osenbrugh – producer and engineer on tracks 1, 2, 3, 4, 7, 10, 11, 12, 13 and 14
 Lisa Klassen – engineer on tracks 1, 2, 3, 4, 7, 10, 11, 12, 13 and 14
 Roger Lian – mastering

References

2003 albums
My Ruin albums
Century Media Records albums
Albums produced by Nick Raskulinecz